Anatoly Zourpenko (alternate spellings: Anatoli, Zourmpenko, Zhurbenko; 5 November 1975 – 24 October 2022) was a Greek-Russian professional basketball player. He was 2.12 m (6' 11 ") tall and played at the power forward and center positions.

Early life
Zourpenko was born on 5 November 1975, in Volgograd, Russian SFSR, Soviet Union. He grew up in Greece, after having moved there as a young child.

Professional career
Zourpenko played with the Greek club Olympiacos Piraeus, from 1995 to 1998. With Olympiacos, he won the coveted Triple Crown title, by winning the Greek League championship, the Greek Cup title, and the EuroLeague championship, all in the same year, in 1997. He also played at the 1997 McDonald's Championship Final, against the NBA's Chicago Bulls.

During his club career, Zourpenko also played with the Greek clubs Papagou, Maroussi, Near East, Panellinios, and Ilysiakos.

Personal life and death
Zourpenko died on 24 October 2022 at the age of 46.

References

External links 
FIBA EuroLeague Profile
Eurobasket.com Profile
Greek Basket League Profile 
Greek Basket League Profile 

1975 births
2022 deaths
Sportspeople from Volgograd
Centers (basketball)
Greek Basket League players
Greek men's basketball players
Greek people of Russian descent
Ilysiakos B.C. players
Maroussi B.C. players
Naturalized citizens of Greece
Near East B.C. players
Olympiacos B.C. players
Papagou B.C. players
Panellinios B.C. players
Power forwards (basketball)
Russian men's basketball players
Sporting basketball players